Eriocrania salopiella (also known as the small birch purple) is a moth of the family Eriocraniidae and is found in Europe. It was described by the English entomologist, Henry Tibbats Stainton in 1854. The larvae mine the leaves of birch (Betula species).

Description
The wingspan is about 1 centimetre. The adult moths are golden coloured with purple markings with prominent yellow triangular patch on the tornus. The head is covered with golden hairs. Flies in the sunshine in April and May amongst birches.

 Ovum
Eggs are laid on the leaves of birch including silver birch (Betula pendula) and downy birch (Betula pubescens)

 Larva
The larvae are whitish with a pale brown head and mine the leaves of birch (Betula species) in May and June. The mine starts as a corridor, usually near the mid-rib and gradually widens to a blotch. Eriocrania sparrmannella has a similar looking mine, but feeds from mid-June to August.<ref>{{cite web |last1=Kimber |first1=Ian |title=Eriocrania sparrmannella (Bosc, 1791) |url=https://ukmoths.org.uk/species/eriocrania-sparrmannella/ |website=UKmoths |access-date=17 April 2022}}</ref>

 Pupa
The larvae pupate in the soil in a tough, silken cocoon.

Distribution
The moth is found in northern and central Europe.

Etymology
Stainton described the moth from a specimen found near Shrewsbury, Shropshire, England. He initially allocated the moth to the genus Micropteryx, which comes from the Greek for mikros, little and pterux, a wing. The moth was later moved to the genus Erioncrania. Erion refers to wool and kranion means the upper part of the head, which literally means woolly-headed, i.e. rough-haired, referring to the scales on the top of the head. The specific name, salopiella'' refers to Salop i.e. Shropshire, the locality of the type specimen.

References

External links
 Swedish Moths
 UKmoths

salopiella
Leaf miners
Moths described in 1854
Moths of Europe
Taxa named by Henry Tibbats Stainton